Grbavce is a village in the municipality of Medveđa, Serbia. According to the 2002 census, the village has a population of 276 people. Of these, 275 (99,63 %) were ethnic Albanians, and 1 (0,36 %) other.

References

Populated places in Jablanica District
Albanian communities in Serbia